Huangge (黄阁镇) is a town in the Nansha District of Guangzhou, the largest city in the People's Republic of China.

Nansha District
Township-level divisions of Guangdong